Bobby Arthur (born 27 July 1945) is a British former boxer who was British welterweight champion between 1972 and 1973.

Career
From Coventry, Bobby Arthur had a successful amateur career, including representing England and winning a silver medal at welterweight at the 1966 British Empire and Commonwealth Games, in Kingston, Jamaica. He made his professional debut in March 1967 with a win over Pat Walsh. He won his first 14 fights, before suffering his first defeat in November 1969 to former British lightweight champion Maurice Cullen. He won only two of seven fights in 1970 but a win over Ernest Musso in May 1971 started a run of three wins which led to a fight against John H. Stracey in October 1972 for the vacant British welterweight title at the Royal Albert Hall. Stracey was disqualified in the seventh round for punching after the referee had called a break, giving Arthur the title.

Arthur and Stracey met again for the title at the same venue in June 1973; This time Stracey was the winner via a fourth-round knockout.

Arthur then moved up to light middleweight to face Larry Paul for the newly created British title in September 1973. Paul knocked Arthur out in the tenth round to take the title.

Arthur was out of the ring for over a year, returning with a loss to Jeff Gale in December 1974. He continued until late 1976 but only won three more fights.

References

External links

1945 births
Living people
English male boxers
Welterweight boxers
Light-middleweight boxers
Sportspeople from Coventry
Boxers at the 1966 British Empire and Commonwealth Games
Commonwealth Games silver medallists for England
Commonwealth Games medallists in boxing
Medallists at the 1966 British Empire and Commonwealth Games